Mama, You Can Bet! is a studio album by Georgia Anne Muldrow, her third under the name Jyoti.

Track listing

References

2020 albums